Xiaowen Zeng is a Chinese-Canadian author living in Toronto, Canada.

Biography
Xiaowen Zeng was born in Jiamusi in the Heilongjiang of China. She received a Master of Arts in Literature from Nankai University, and a Master of Science in IT from Syracuse University. She lived in the United States for 9 years, and immigrated to Canada in 2003.

Xiaowen has worked in the IT field for more than 20 years including as System Analyst, IT Manager, Sr. Director of IT in Canada, the U.S. and China. She has published a number of works of fiction and non-fiction, and screenplays.

Community activities include:
 Vice Chair and Chair of the Chinese Pen Society of Canada from 2004 to 2012
 Co-organized the First Chinese Canadian International Literature Symposium in 2011
 Presented at a number of Oversea Chinese Literature conferences in China
 Interviewed by CCTV (China) in 2006 and 2014; by OMNI Television in 2010, 2014 and 2018; by Fairchild TV in 2009 and 2018; and by a number of TV/radio stations, journals and newspaper in China, Canada and the US
 Presentations of readings and lectures at Toronto Public Library, at schools including Harvard University, the University of Toronto, York University, Western University in Canada, and Jinan University, Zhejiang University, People's University, Nankai University, and Tianjin Normal University in China

Selected works

Published works in Chinese

Novel
 The China Chip 2019, Co-Author
 The Immigrant Years 2013
 The Night Is Still Young 2009
 Shattered Dreams in Texas (also published as The Daytime Floating Journey) 2005

Collection of novellas and short stories
 A Double Petaled Woman 2017
 Too Tired to Love 2016
 The Kilt and Clover 2012

Collection of prose
 The Woman Born a Leaf 2018
 Carrying the Soul Back Home 2017
 Turn Your Back to the Moon 2012

TV script
 Co-wrote and published a 20-episode TV drama Invented in China in 2011. It was made into a 30-episode series re-titled Let Go of Your Hand and aired in 2014 in China. 

Translation
 Anne of Green Gables 2018

Movie script
 Langqin Island 2013

Published works in English
 A translated version of Carrying the Soul Back Home has been published on the Ricepaper.ca website and was included in the Ricepaper 2017 print anthology Currents. It also was long listed for PRISM magazine’s 2015 Creative Non-Fiction Contest.
 First original English short story Return to Gander was published in an anthology of short stories by Chinese authors entitled The Strangers in 2016
 Two short stories, The Kilt and Clover and The Smell, were published in an anthology of translated works by Canadian Chinese Writers entitled Toward the North in 2018

Awards
 2022 CBC Nonfiction Prize longlist for "Wildflower of the Labour Camp"
 Overseas Chinese Writing Award for A Double Petaled Woman (in 2019
 The Great Bay Area Cyber Literature Award for in 2019
 LinGuo Best Creativity Award for TV script in 2019
 Overseas Chinese Writing Award for The Woman Born a Leaf (in 2018
 Top 10 novellas of 2017 as ranked by the China Fiction Association, for Gold Dust
 Top prize in the First Global Chinese Prose Competition, 2014, for Carrying the Soul Back Home
 The Chinese Writers Erdos Literature Award (2011)
 Zhongshan Overseas Literature Award (2011)
 2011 Best TV Script Award sponsored by the Beijing Municipal Bureau of Radio, Film and television
 Top 10 short stories of 2009 as ranked by the China Fiction Association, for The Kilt and Clover
 United Daily News Literature Prize, 2004
 Central Daily News literature Prize, 1996

External links
 Wildflower of the Labour Camp by Zeng Xiaowen
 Zeng Xiaowen’s Weibo
 Zeng Xiaowen's ebooks at Amazon
 Zeng Xiaowen at York University Reading
 ECT presents a lecture by Ms. Xiaowen Zeng

Living people
21st-century Canadian novelists
Syracuse University alumni
Nankai University alumni
Writers from Heilongjiang
Canadian women novelists
Chinese emigrants to Canada
Canadian writers of Asian descent
Canadian women short story writers
21st-century Canadian women writers
21st-century Canadian short story writers
Year of birth missing (living people)